The Presbyterian Church in Korea (HapDongJinRi) was founded in 1980, but the origin goes back to Pastor Hur Kwang-Jae, who founded the  Gospel Seminary in 1976. This Seminary become the nucleus of the Presbyterian Church in Korea (BokUm). In 1979 a break occurred in the Presbyterian Church in Korea (HapDong), and they contacted the non-mainline part. But they soon separated, to maintain their own character. Finally in 1980 the HapDongJinRi was founded. It subscribes the Apostles Creed and the Westminster Confession. In 2004, the denomination had 44,747 in 397 congregations. Later Jan Jong-Hyun a pastor with his church separated and joined the Presbyterian Church in Korea (HapDongJeongTong).

References

1980 establishments in South Korea
Presbyterian denominations in South Korea
Presbyterian denominations in Asia